Charles James may refer to:
 Charles James (British Army officer) (1757/8–1821), English army officer and writer
 Charles James (attorney) (born 1954), former U.S. assistant attorney general
 Charles James (American football) (born 1990), American football cornerback
 Charlie James (baseball) (born 1937), baseball player
 Charles James (chemist) (1880–1928), discoverer of lutetium
 Charles James (designer) (1906–1978), fashion designer
 Charlie James (footballer) (1874–1948), Australian rules footballer
 Charles James (footballer) (1882–1960), footballer for Stoke
 Charles James (MP) (1817–1890), British politician
 Charles James (rugby league) (1891–1917), New Zealand rugby league footballer
 Charles C. James (1882–1957), American consulting accountant
 Charlie Hamilton James (born c. 1974), English photographer, television cameraman and presenter
 Charles Hamilton James, Count of Arran, Anglo-Scottish soldier and author
 Charles Holloway James (1893–1953), architect
 Charles O. James, Texas state senator, 1899–1903; state representative, 1893–1895, see Texas Senate, District 2
 Charles Pinckney James (1818–1899), U.S. federal judge
 Charles Tillinghast James (1805–1862), U.S. Senator from Rhode Island
 Chuck James (born 1981), baseball player
 Charles James (cricketer) (1885–1950), English cricketer